The 1994 Women's  World Team Squash Championships were held in Saint Peter Port, Guernsey and took place from October 10 until October 16, 1994.

Seeds

Results

First round

Pool A

Pool B

Semi finals

Third place play off

Final

References

See also 
World Team Squash Championships
World Squash Federation
World Open (squash)

World Squash Championships
Squash
Wom
1994 in women's squash
International sports competitions hosted by the Channel Islands
Sports competitions in Guernsey
Squash in the Channel Islands